Robert Acri (October 1, 1918 – July 25, 2013) was an American jazz pianist. Acri graduated from Austin High School in Chicago. While at Austin High, he began his career at the NBC Orchestra on the Dave Garroway Radio Show. He was a classically trained pianist, studying with Rudolph Ganz and Fred Euing. He also studied composition with Dr. Karel Jirak and Bill Russo. During his career he played in the radio orchestras of NBC and ABC, as well as in the House Band of the Chicago nightclub Mister Kelly's. He toured with Harry James and accompanied Lena Horne, Mike Douglas, Ella Fitzgerald, Barbra Streisand, Buddy Rich, and Woody Herman. He earned his Bachelor's of Music and Master's of Music degree from Roosevelt University when he was in his late 70s. He ended his career as the leader of the house band at the Cantina Room of the Continental Plaza Hotel.

Acri released two solo albums of instrumental tracks in 2001 and 2004. "Sleep Away", a composition that appeared on his 2004 self-titled album, was selected by Microsoft as a sample demo music for Windows 7 to demonstrate the newly released Windows Media Player.

Discography 
 2001: Timeless – The Music of Bob Acri
 2004: Sleep Away (with George Mraz, Ed Thigpen, Lew Soloff, Frank Wess and Diane Delin)

References

External links 
 Biography
 Official Website (Archived)

1918 births
2013 deaths
Musicians from Chicago
American jazz pianists
Jazz musicians from Illinois